A total solar eclipse occurred on February 21, 1803. A solar eclipse occurs when the Moon passes between Earth and the Sun, thereby totally or partly obscuring the image of the Sun for a viewer on Earth. A total solar eclipse occurs when the Moon's apparent diameter is larger than the Sun's, blocking all direct sunlight, turning day into darkness. Totality occurs in a narrow path across Earth's surface, with the partial solar eclipse visible over a surrounding region thousands of kilometres wide.
The eclipse was visible in Pacific Ocean and Central America, while the totality was seen in Mexico.

See also 
 List of solar eclipses in the 19th century
 List of solar eclipses visible from the United States

References

External links 
 Google interactive maps
 Solar eclipse data

1803 02 21
1803 in science
1803 02 21
February 1803 events